Maplewood is an unincorporated community in Pierce County, Washington, USA.  It is located south of Olalla on Puget Sound's Colvos Passage near Crescent Lake.

References

External links
Maplewood Park at PenMet Parks

Census-designated places in Pierce County, Washington
Census-designated places in Washington (state)